Stanborough is the site of an Iron Age hill fort near the village of Halwell, south of Totnes, Devon, England. The site was first listed as a historical heritage in 1923.

References

Hill forts in Devon
South Hams